To Ngoc Van may refer to:

To Ngoc Van, a pit-floored crater on Mercury.
Tô Ngọc Vân, a Vietnamese painter.